Mullaghbrack, Mullabrack or Mullaghbrac is a small village, townland and civil parish in County Armagh, Northern Ireland. It is on the road between Markethill and Hamiltonsbawn, just north of Gosford Forest Park. It had a population of 54 people (24 households) in the 2011 Census. (2001 Census: 75 people)

History

In the 5th Century a simple wooden church was built at Mullaghbrack, within the remains of an ancient earthen-ringed fort by the Culdee Priors of Armagh, who were regarded by some as successors of St. Patrick.

During the Irish Rebellion of 1641, Markethill and its district did not escape the havoc. Irish commander Féilim Ó Néill, on his march from Newry to Armagh in 1641, ordered Mulmory MacDonell "... to kill all the English and Scots within the parishes of Mullebrack, Logilly and Kilcluney". Among properties destroyed were the Parish Churches of Mullaghbrack and Kilcluney, Achesons Castle at Markethill and Hamilton's bawn. The rectors of Mullaghbrack (Reverend Mercer) and Loughgilly (Reverend Burns) both lost their lives.

People
Lord William Beresford (William Leslie de la Poer Beresford) (1847-1900), born in Mullabrack, received the Victoria Cross during the Anglo-Zulu War.

Sport
The local GAA club is O'Donovan Rossa's (Cumann Uí Dhonnabháin Rossa), founded in 1903 as the Shamrocks; it disappeared in the 1930s but was reformed under its present name in 1953. The high point in the club's history was its winning the county Junior championship in 1983.

See also
List of civil parishes of County Armagh

References

Villages in County Armagh
Townlands of County Armagh
Civil parishes of County Armagh